James William Young Kemp, known as Hamish Kemp, (13 February 1933 in Glasgow – 5 June 2002 in Glasgow) was a Scottish international rugby union player, who played at lock/second row.

Rugby Union career

Amateur career

He played for Glasgow HSFP.

Provincial career

He played for Glasgow District in the Scottish Inter-District Championship. He won the title with Glasgow District in season 1955-56.

International career

Administrative career

He became the 98th President of the Scottish Rugby Union. He served the standard one year from 1984 to 1985.

References

Sources

 Bath, Richard (ed.) The Scotland Rugby Miscellany (Vision Sports Publishing Ltd, 2007 )

1933 births
2002 deaths
Scottish rugby union players
Scotland international rugby union players
Rugby union players from Glasgow
Glasgow District (rugby union) players
Glasgow HSFP players
Presidents of the Scottish Rugby Union
Rugby union locks